Pierre-Emmanuel Ekwah Elimby (born 15 January 2002) is a French footballer who plays as a midfielder for Sunderland.

Club career

Early career
Born in Massy, Essonne, just outside of Paris, Ekwah began his career with amateur sides RC Arpajonnais, Bretigny FCS and CFF Paris, also spending three years in the INF Clairefontaine academy. He joined Nantes in 2017, spending one season before moving to England to join the academy of Chelsea.

After three years with The Blues, in which he played in the UEFA Youth League and trained with the first team, he was linked with a move away from the club in 2021, going on trial with Portsmouth. He also trialled with West Ham United, playing the last two Premier League 2 games of the 2020–21 season for The Hammers, scoring once against Arsenal.

On 9 June 2021, West Ham United announced the signing of Ekwah from Chelsea on a three-year deal for an undisclosed fee.

Sunderland
After a year and a half, in which he was unable to break into the West Ham United first team, featuring in the EFL Trophy for the club's under-21 side, he was linked with a loan move to EFL Championship side Sunderland in January 2023. On 23 January 2023, he moved to Sunderland on a permanent transfer, penning a four-and-a-half year deal.

International career
Ekwah has represented France at youth international level. He is also eligible to represent Ghana.

Style of play
A powerful figure, standing at 1.89 m tall, he has stated that his favourite role on the pitch is as a box-to-box midfielder, and lists Zinedine Zidane as his childhood idol. He has also played as a defensive midfielder, as well as dropping in to the back line to play as a left-back or centre-back.

Career statistics

References

2002 births
Living people
People from Massy, Essonne
Footballers from Essonne
French footballers
Black French sportspeople
France youth international footballers
French sportspeople of Ghanaian descent
Association football midfielders
Association football defenders
INF Clairefontaine players
FC Nantes players
Chelsea F.C. players
West Ham United F.C. players
Sunderland A.F.C. players
French expatriate footballers
French expatriate sportspeople in England
Expatriate footballers in England